Fontainebleau is a 1956 album by jazz musician Tadd Dameron. The composition "Flossie Lou" is a contrafact of "Jeepers Creepers".

Track listing
All tracks composed by Tadd Dameron.
 "Fontainebleau" – 4:48
 "Delirium" –  5:00
 "The Scene Is Clean" – 5:00
 "Flossie Lou" – 4:50
 "Bula-Beige" – 11:20
Recorded March 9, 1956, at Van Gelder Studio, Hackensack, New Jersey.

Personnel
 Kenny Dorham – trumpet
 Henry Coker  – trombone 
 Cecil Payne - baritone saxophone
 Sahib Shihab – alto saxophone 
 Joe Alexander – tenor saxophone
 Tadd Dameron – piano
 John Simmons – bass  
 Shadow Wilson – drums

References

1956 albums
Tadd Dameron albums
Prestige Records albums
Albums recorded at Van Gelder Studio